The F.W. Meaders House, at 521 South Broadway in Ada, Oklahoma, was built in 1929.  It was listed on the National Register of Historic Places in 2007.

It was designed by local architect Albert S. Ross.  It is Classical Revival in style. House was torn down by First Baptist Church, circa 2010.

References

National Register of Historic Places in Pontotoc County, Oklahoma
Neoclassical architecture in Oklahoma
Buildings and structures completed in 1929